Kenneth B. Ain is an American endocrinologist and Carmen L. Buck Chair and Professorship of Cancer Research and Oncology at the University of Kentucky, and also currently a licensed doctor and published author, being collected by libraries worldwide.

References

University of Kentucky faculty
American endocrinologists
Writers from Kentucky
Brown University alumni
Living people
Year of birth missing (living people)
Place of birth missing (living people)
American medical writers